Kalle Lasn (born March 24, 1942) is an Estonian-Canadian film maker, author, magazine editor, and activist. Near the end of World War II, his family fled Estonia and Lasn spent some time in a German refugee camp. At age seven he was resettled in Australia with his family, where he grew up and remained until the late 1960s, attending school in Canberra. In the late 1960s, he founded a market research company in Tokyo, and in 1970, moved to Vancouver, British Columbia, Canada. Over the course of twenty years, he produced documentaries for PBS and Canada’s National Film Board. He currently resides in Vancouver, British Columbia.

He is the co-founder of Adbusters magazine and author of the books Culture Jam and Design Anarchy and is the co-founder of the Adbusters Media Foundation, which owns the magazine. He reportedly started Adbusters after an epiphany that there was something profoundly wrong with consumerism. It happened in a supermarket parking lot. Frustrated that he had to insert a quarter to use a shopping cart, he jammed a bent coin in so that the machine became inoperable. This act of vandalism was his first (quite literal) "culture jam"—defined as an act designed to subvert mainstream society.

Life and work

Born in Tallinn, Estonia, during World War II, Lasn's family fled to Germany and he spent several years after the war in a displaced-persons camp before his family were offered resettlement in Australia. In Australia he earned a degree in applied mathematics and then relocated to Tokyo, where he spent five years running his own market-research firm before eventually immigrating to Canada in 1970. Lasn’s life works are applied within the philosophical lens of the French Situationists theory and the philosophy of detournement. His concept pertained to the "rerouting [of] spectacular images, environments, ambiences and events to reverse or subvert their meaning." Lasn has also contemporized the concept of the Spectacle, in which he applies to explain the thousands of images encountered by consumers on a daily basis.

In an interview with PRWeek magazine, Lasn recalls the moment in 1989, as an environmental campaigner, when he realized that all brands carry a "political message". In response to a multimillion-dollar marketing campaign launched by the forest industry, which sought to reassure the Pacific Northwest that they had nothing to worry about, Lasn and his team developed a 30-second advertisement of their own which would challenge the initial campaign. However, Lasn’s attempt at airing the spot on television ultimately failed, as the TV station refused to sell him any time. Lasn referred to this move as "absurd and unfair" because "even the most innocuous product ad is laden with unspoken and unquestioned political assumptions", adding that no line exists between product and advocacy ads, and that all ads are political.

Adbusters

Inspired by what he saw as the lack of democracy in access to all-power media, Lasn founded Adbusters, a bi-monthly radicalizing magazine which lends itself the title of one of the leading voices in global environmentalism, anti-capitalist and anti-consumerist movements. Having worked in market research in Japan in the 1960s, Lasn drew from his personal experience and knowledge to produce publications and campaigns that would employ the necessary tools and techniques to create powerful imagery, stunts, slick graphics and vibrant language to promote his cause.

By taking conventional marketing communication techniques and applying them to anti-consumerism messages, Adbusters has created a powerful, global social movement, which takes aim at large-scale industries. Although the company’s headquarters in Vancouver only has ten employees, it has a large global following, with 40,000 paper subscribers and 30,000 online subscribers. Lasn claims that ‘’Adbusters" is the "hub of global activism – it’s the (communication) model of the future".

Books and films

In his first book, Culture Jam, Lasn portrays consumerism as the fundamental evil of the modern era. He calls for a "meme war": a battle of ideas to shift Western society away from consumer capitalism. Lasn, in his book, calls on the values of authenticity, individuality and freedom of expression. He promotes the rebelling of the notion that hierarchies can dictate people’s identities. Essentially, Lasn’s concept of culture jamming calls upon consumers to value experiences over possessions, while accusing marketing experts of co-opting these values and "slapping a brand name on them".

His second book, Design Anarchy, calls on graphic designers, illustrators and others to turn from working in service to corporate and political pollution of both the planet and "the mental environment", and to embrace a radical new aesthetic devoted to social and environmental responsibility.. The book, which in an introduction to Lasn’s notion of culture jamming, includes a compilation of some of Adbuster’s greatest moments, but with the addition of what Lasn calls a "technical event", which forces the mind to take notice of something and search for meaning, even if there is no meaning. This "technical event" invites readers to become mindful of their patterns of consumption.  Similar to Lasn’s prior book, Design Anarchy is a "personal statement, manifesto and textbook", which takes many of the prominent advertising campaigns found in the Adbusters magazine, and reconfigures them to stop "the flow of bits of information long enough to interrupt the spectacle, to promote the jolt, to allow the process of awareness". In the book, Lasn claims that if members of a society can begin by demarking themselves, then they are able to de-market certain rituals imposed by commercial forces, consequently shifting the ways in which the customer interacts with mass media, the way information flows, and the ways in which meaning is produced, ultimately leading to a break in commercial meaning and a shift to a post-consumerist society.

In his third book, Meme Wars: The Creative Destruction of Neoclassic Economics, Lasn prefaces the book by calling on University students to realize that they are being "fooled by the façade" of the capitalist educational system, adding that the lack of incorporation of externalities such as species extinction, resource depletion, climate change, and financial meltdowns has turned the profession into a "target for derision and ridicule". Lasn challenges students to look beneath the surface of the façade to realize that economics is a "highly contested" and "questionable" field. To do so, Lasn offers two distinct ways for students to approach their academic endeavours: to either "accept the status quo" of the system, or become "an agitator, a provocateur, a meme warrior, and occupier", calling on students to engage in a paradigm shift within educational institutions. The book includes a series of essays, photographs and advertisements, which support Lasn’s approach to culture jamming.

Lasn made documentary films for 20 years beginning in 1970 - many of them to do with Japan, the homeland of his wife, Masako Tominaga. His award-winning films include:
 Bears and Man (Co-writer, editor)
 Japan Inc: Lessons for North America?
 Japanese Woman
 Satori in the Right Cortex
 The Rise and Fall of American Business Culture
 The Autumn Rain: Crime in Japan

Activism and views

Lasn, in collaboration with others of Adbusters, came up with the original idea for an Occupy Wall Street (OWS) demonstration, but has been careful not to claim ownership of it.

In March 2004, Lasn published an article in Adbusters pointing out that, whereas less than two percent of Americans are Jewish, 26 of the top 50 (from a list of George W. Bush-era neoconservatives) advocating war in Iraq are Jewish (52 percent).

Bibliography
 Lasn, Kalle (2000) Culture Jam, New York: Quill
 Lasn, K. (2005) Design Anarchy, Vancouver: Adbusters Media Foundation
 Lasn, Kalle (2012) Meme Wars: The Creative Destruction of Neoclassical Economics, New York: Seven Stories Press,

References

External links

 Adbusters website
 
 Kalle Lasn interview (11/20/2006)
 Kalle Lasn profile
 Kalle Lasn: 4 video messages for the Cologne Thumper design award (2007)
 Kalle Lasn, Typo 2006: The Future of Design (video)
 Donovan King. Optative Theatre: A Critical Theory for Challenging Oppression and Spectacle  (2004),  (2004)
 —controversial 2004 column by Lasn
 Kalle Lasn on NFB.ca

1942 births
Living people
People from Tallinn
Anti-consumerists
Anti-corporate activists
Canadian documentary film directors
Canadian male essayists
Canadian magazine editors
Canadian political writers
Estonian emigrants to Canada
Estonian World War II refugees
Mass media theorists
Film directors from Vancouver
Writers from Vancouver
Criticism of capitalism
20th-century Canadian essayists
20th-century Canadian male writers
21st-century Canadian essayists
21st-century Canadian male writers
Canadian magazine founders